The 2008 Tongan Legislative Assembly is the previous term of the Legislative Assembly of Tonga.  Its composition was determined by the 2008 elections, held on April 23 and 24, 2008.  It served until 2010, when special elections were held under a new constitution.

Nine members of the parliament were People's Representatives, nine represented the 33 nobles, and fourteen were Cabinet Ministers appointed by the King.

The Speaker of the 2008 Legislative Assembly was Hon Tu'ilakepa.

Initial party standings

|-
! style="background-color:#E9E9E9;text-align:left;vertical-align:top;" |Parties
! style="background-color:#E9E9E9;text-align:right;" |Votes
! style="background-color:#E9E9E9;text-align:right;" |%
! style="background-color:#E9E9E9;text-align:right;" |Seats
|-
| style="text-align:left;" |Human Rights and Democracy Movement
| style="text-align:right;" |21,914
| style="text-align:right;" |28.36
| style="text-align:right;" |4
|-
| style="text-align:left;" |Independents
| style="text-align:right;" |41,798
| style="text-align:right;" |54.09
| style="text-align:right;" |3
|-
| style="text-align:left;" |People's Democratic Party
| style="text-align:right;" |10,798
| style="text-align:right;" |13.97
| style="text-align:right;" |2
|-
| style="text-align:left;" |Paati Langafonua Tu'uloa
| style="text-align:right;" |2,768
| style="text-align:right;" |3.58
| style="text-align:right;" |0
|-
| style="text-align:left;" |Members elected by and among the 29 hereditary nobles of Tonga
| style="text-align:right;" colspan="3" |9
|-
| style="text-align:left;" |Members of the Privy Council (appointed by the King)
| style="text-align:right;" colspan="3" |12
|-
| style="text-align:left;" |Governors (appointed by the King)
| style="text-align:right;" colspan="3" |2
|-
|style="text-align:left;background-color:#E9E9E9"|Total
|width="75" style="text-align:right;background-color:#E9E9E9"|77,278
|width="30" style="text-align:right;background-color:#E9E9E9"|100.00
|width="30" style="text-align:right;background-color:#E9E9E9"|30
|-
| style="text-align:left;" colspan=4 | Source: 
|}

Members

References

Politics of Tonga
Political organisations based in Tonga